4.0 is a compilation album by Spanish recording singer-songwriter Mónica Naranjo. The album was released through Sony Music Spain and Legacy on May 6, 2014. The album contains 4.0 re-recorded versions of tracks from her studio albums—Mónica Naranjo (1994), Palabra de mujer (1997), Minage (2000) and Tarántula (2008)—and a 4.0 version of "Make You Rock". "Solo Se Vive una Vez (4.0 Version)" was released as the first single from the album on March 31, 2014.

Track listing

Charts

References

2014 compilation albums
Mónica Naranjo compilation albums
Sony Music compilation albums
Legacy Recordings compilation albums